Proll may refer to:

Thorwald Proll (born 1941), German writer, short-time member of the Red Army Fraction, brother of Astrid
Astrid Proll (born 1947), member of the Red Army Fraction, sister of Thorwald
Nina Proll (born 1974), Austrian actress

See also

Pröll, people with that surname